Homer Judd (March 28, 1820 – May 20, 1890) was president of the American Dental Association (1868-1869) and the first dean (1866-1874) of the Missouri Dental College (which later became the Washington University School of Dental Medicine).

References

1820 births
1890 deaths
American dentists
People from Berkshire County, Massachusetts
Physicians from Massachusetts
Deaths from stomach cancer
Deaths from cancer in Illinois
People from St. Louis
American dentistry academics
19th-century dentists
Washington University in St. Louis faculty